Sheffield United Football Club is an English professional football club who play at Bramall Lane in Sheffield.  They were formed in 1889 and played their first competitive match in October of that year, when they entered the first qualifying round of the FA Cup. Since then more than 1,000 players have made a competitive first-team appearance for the club, of whom a large number have made between 25 and 99 appearances (including substitute appearances); those players are listed here.

Overview of the list
Since the club's formation in 1889 over 300 players have made between 25 and 99 appearances for the club. Throughout the club's history no player has played 99 competitive gamed for the Blades without going on to make a 100th appearance. The closest to achieving this feat are the six players that played 98 times prior to leaving the club; they being Peter Beagrie, Alonzo Drake, Colin Grainger, Tom Heffernan, Bobby Howitt, and Mark Todd.  Midfielder Stefan Scougall was the most recent player to reach the 25 appearance mark for Sheffield United in October 2014, and of the current United squad, eight players (Jose Baxter, Ben Davies, Bob Harris, Mark Howard, George Long, Stephen McGinn, Jamie Murphy, and Stefan Scougall) feature on this list but therefore have the opportunity to add more appearances to their total.

A number of players on this list had more than one spell with United, but only Jon Harley signed for the Blades on three separate occasions (twice on loan and once on a permanent contract), becoming one of only two players to achieve this feat in the club's history. There are also a number of players on this list whose entire time with United was spent on loan; Mark Bunn, Conor Coady, Greg Halford, and Nyron Nosworthy. The most prolific scorer to appear on this list is striker Bert Menlove who scored 43 times in his 81 appearances between 1922 and 1926.

Explanation of list

Players are listed in alphabetical order of their surname. Appearances, substitute appearances and goals are included but wartime matches and friendlies are excluded. Further information on competitions/seasons which are regarded as eligible for appearance stats are provided below (dependent on the years at which the player was at the club), and if any data is not available for any of these competitions an appropriate note should be added to the table.

Appearances
Games included in the stats include appearances in:
Midland Football League, Northern League, Football League/Premier League
Test matches and play-off matches
International, national and local cup fixtures including; FA Cup, Football League Cup, Football League Trophy, Football League Group Cup, Texaco Cup, Anglo-Scottish Cup, Anglo-Italian Cup, Watney Cup

NB: Friendly matches, exhibition games, and pre-season tournaments are excluded from the figures.  Games played during both World Wars are considered friendlies and therefore are also not counted.

Table headers
Nationality – If a player played international football, the country/countries he played for are shown. Otherwise, the player's nationality is given as their country of birth.
Sheffield United career – The year of the player's first appearance for Sheffield United to the year of his last appearance.  Where a player had more than one spell at the club these are listed chronologically.
Starts – The number of games started.
Sub – The number of games played as a substitute.
Total – The total number of games played, both as a starter and as a substitute.

Key
Playing positions: GK = Goalkeeper; DF = Defender; MF = Midfielder; FW = Forward
  Players with this colour and symbol in the "Name" column are currently signed to Sheffield United.

List of players

See also
List of Sheffield United F.C. players

References
General

Specific

Players (25-99 appearances)
 
Sheffield United (25-99 appearances)
Association football player non-biographical articles